Hrant Ayvazyan (born 14 September 1969), is an Armenian politician, Member of the National Assembly of Armenia of Bright Armenia's faction.

References 

1969 births
Living people
21st-century Armenian politicians